The Port Jervis station is a disused train station at the corner of Jersey Avenue and Fowler Street in Port Jervis, New York. It was built in 1892 as a passenger station for the Erie Railroad by Grattan & Jennings in the Queen Anne style. For years it was the busiest passenger station on the railroad's Delaware Branch because Port Jervis is along the Delaware River near the tripoint of New York, New Jersey, and Pennsylvania. The long-distance passenger trains Erie Limited and the Lake Cities between Chicago and Hoboken served this station.

The decline in passenger rail traffic in the mid-20th century, after many people had switched to automobile travel on the federally subsidized highways, resulted in the termination of passenger service between Port Jervis and Binghamton in 1970. Local commuter service to Hoboken was taken over by the Metropolitan Transportation Authority's Metro-North Railroad shortly thereafter. Rather than using the Erie Depot,  Metro-North built a minimalist station of its own. It had a parking lot for passengers' cars, a shelter, and a street-level concrete platform.

The original station declined in condition (along with the city). It was listed on the National Register of Historic Places in 1980 as the Erie Railroad Station. Since then it has been renovated.  It houses several small shops on the street side.


See also
Middletown station (Erie Railroad)

Bibliography

References

External links

Former railway stations in New York (state)
Historic American Engineering Record in New York (state)
National Register of Historic Places in Orange County, New York
Railway stations on the National Register of Historic Places in New York (state)
Railway stations in the United States opened in 1847
Railway stations closed in 1970
Port Jervis, New York
Railway stations in Orange County, New York
Former Erie Railroad stations
1970 disestablishments in New York (state)
Repurposed railway stations in the United States